Oduwole is a Yoruba surname. It may refer to:
Deji Oduwole (born August 23, 1987), former gridiron football player
Zuriel Oduwole (born c. 2002), Nigerian-American film-maker and writer
Jumoke Oduwole, Nigerian academic and jurist

Yoruba-language surnames